District 8 of the Oregon State Senate comprises northwestern Linn County and northeastern Benton County, centered around Albany and Corvallis. It is currently represented by Democrat Sara Gelser of Corvallis.

Election results
District boundaries have changed over time, therefore, senators before 2013 may not represent the same constituency as today. From 1993 until 2003, the district covered parts of north Portland, and from 2003 until 2013 it covered a slightly different area in Benton and Linn Counties.

References

08
Benton County, Oregon
Linn County, Oregon